Mezhybrody is a village (selo) in Stryi Raion, Lviv Oblast, of Western Ukraine. Mezhybrody village is located in a picturesque corner of the Carpathians of Skole district, at the foot of where the two mountain rivers  — Stryi River and Opir River. Village is located close to Highway M06 (Ukraine). It belongs to Skole urban hromada, one of the hromadas of Ukraine. Local government — Verkhnosynovydnenska settlement council. Population of the village amounts to only 214 people.

The village was first mentioned in 1564.

Until 18 July 2020, Mezhybrody belonged to Skole Raion. The raion was abolished in July 2020 as part of the administrative reform of Ukraine, which reduced the number of raions of Lviv Oblast to seven. The area of Skole Raion was merged into Stryi Raion.

References

External links 
 weather.in.ua
 Про село Межиброди 
 Межиброди, Матеріал з Вікіпедії 
Межиброди 

Villages in Stryi Raion